McAllister Point is a point in the Central Coast region of British Columbia, Canada, on the east shore of the meeting of Moses and Rivers Inlets.

References

Central Coast of British Columbia